Hallbosjön is a lake in Södermanland County, Sweden.

References

Lakes of Södermanland County